The 1994 Fianna Fáil leadership election began in November 1994, when Albert Reynolds resigned as party leader and Taoiseach. Reynolds had been party leader since February 1992 and had served as Taoiseach since then.  His successor was elected by the members of the Fianna Fáil parliamentary party on 19 December 1994. Bertie Ahern was the only candidate to stand and was thus elected leader.

Candidates

Standing
 Bertie Ahern, Minister for Finance

Declined to stand
 Máire Geoghegan-Quinn, Minister for Justice

Bertie Ahern
History of Fianna Fáil
Fianna Fáil leadership elections
Fianna Fáil leadership election
1994 elections in the Republic of Ireland